Solon City School District is a public school district serving Solon, Ohio and Glenwillow, Ohio, which are southeastern suburbs of Cleveland in the Northeast Ohio Region, the 15th largest Combined statistical area in the United States.

Schools

High School (9-12)
 Solon High School

Middle School (7-8)
 Solon Middle School

Upper Elementary School (5-6)
 Orchard Middle School

Elementary School (K-4)
 Dorothy E. Lewis Elementary School
 Parkside Elementary School
 Grace L. Roxbury Elementary School

Preschool
Joseph V. Regano Early Learning Center

History

Academics

In 2012, Solon achieved a rating of 111.2 on the Ohio state performance index and for the 13th consecutive year, the district met all 26 indicators measured on the state report card.  This rating kept the Solon school district among the top five school districts in the state of Ohio, in 2012 ranking #3. The district was listed in Forbes "Top 20 Best Schools for Your Housing Buck" in 2013 at #18.

In 2013, Solon High School was listed as #107 on Newsweeks annual list of America's Best High Schools. The school was given a gold ranking and listed #264 by U.S. News & World Report, #11 in Ohio, and #100 nationally in STEM.

In 2013, Solon High School was awarded the prestigious Red Quill Award from the ACT organization for the sixth consecutive year, and the Red Quill Legacy Award for the second consecutive year, for excellent overall student scores on the ACT. Solon was the only Ohio school to receive the award and one of 21 in the Midwest.

The Solon City School District has also gained recognition for its Science Olympiad and Academic Challenge teams. Among numerous other awards, the Solon Middle School Science Olympiad has taken 1st place at the past six national tournaments (2008-2013), and Solon High School has placed 1st at the past three national tournaments(2011-2013). Members and coaches from both teams have been invited to the annual White House Science Fair multiple times. The teams have also received commendations from the Ohio State Legislature.

In 2017, Niche.com ranked the school district the best in the United States based on analysis that considered factors such as graduation rates, teacher quality, scores on state tests and college admission exams, and economic and racial diversity.

Blue Ribbon Awards
Schools of the district have been recognized by the National Blue Ribbon Schools Program, considered to be the highest honor an American school can achieve, multiple times over the past few decades. Arthur Road Elementary School, Dorothy E. Lewis Elementary School, and Parkside Elementary School have each been recognized, in 2005, 2006, and 2009, respectively.

Solon Middle School received an award in 2010  and Orchard Middle School was one of only two public middle schools in Ohio to receive a Blue Ribbon School Award in 2013.

Solon High School is one of few schools to have received Blue Ribbon awards twice, both in 1991 and 2009.

Board of education
Current leaders and board members are:
 Fred Bolden, Superintendent
 Deborah Siegel, Assistant Superintendent and Curriculum Manager
 Mike Acomb, Director of Business and Personnel
 Tim Pickana, Treasurer
 Julie Glavin, President
 Leann Jones, Vice President
 Kevin Patton
 John Heckman
 Michele Barksdale

References

External links
 Solon City School District
 Solon High School
 Solon Middle School
 Orchard Middle School
 Arthur Road Elementary School
 Dorothy E. Lewis Elementary School
 Parkside Elementary School
 Roxbury Elementary School
 Solon City School District ByLaws

School districts in Cuyahoga County, Ohio
1895 establishments in Ohio
School districts established in 1895